The 2022–23 Cal State Northridge Matadors men's basketball team represented California State University, Northridge in the 2022–23 NCAA Division I men's basketball season. The Matadors, led by head coach Trent Johnson, in his second season, and first without the interim tag, played their home games at the Premier America Credit Union Arena in Northridge, California as members of the Big West Conference.

Previous season
The Matadors finished the 2021–22 season 7–23, 3–13 in Big West play to finish in eighth place. In the Big West tournament, they were defeated by Cal State Bakersfield in the first round.

Roster

Schedule and results

|-
!colspan=12 style=| Non-conference regular season

|-
!colspan=12 style=| Big West regular season

|-
!colspan=12 style=| Big West tournament

Sources

References

Cal State Northridge Matadors men's basketball seasons
Cal State Northridge Matadors
Cal State Northridge Matadors men's basketball
Cal State Northridge Matadors men's basketball